Ralph Kidd Hofer (born Ralph Halbrook, June 22, 1921 – July 2, 1944) was an American fighter pilot and flying ace with the United States Army Air Forces in World War II.

United States Army Air Forces

With his long hair and football jersey, "Kid" Hofer stands out as one of the most memorable characters in the Eighth Air Force. After serving in the Royal Canadian Air Force, Hofer transferred to the 4th Fighter Group in September 1943 and promptly destroyed a Bf 109 on his first mission. Hofer was known for not maintaining radio discipline, and incurred the wrath of group commander Colonel Don Blakeslee on more than one occasion. Hofer was also one of the top strafers in the Eighth Air Force with 14 confirmed enemy aircraft destroyed on the ground. He scored his first two victories in P-47s but is usually associated with P-51B 42-106924 QP—L, nicknamed Salem Representative.

Death
On July 2, 1944 the 4th Fighter Group joined the 352nd and 325th Fighter Groups in a bomber escort mission to Budapest, Hungary, flying from bases in Foggia, Italy. Over the Budapest area, they encountered a force of Bf 109s. A tough battle followed. In all, four P-51s were shot down on the mission. Of the four downed pilots, two were made prisoners of war, and two were killed. The last was Hofer. Luftwaffe records show he was brought down by anti-aircraft fire (flak) while strafing a German fighter base at Mostar Sud airfield in then-Yugoslavia (now Bosnia-Herzegovina)   some 500 kilometers away from the aerial battle . His body was recovered from the wreckage of P-51B, QP-X and the Red Cross ultimately notified Hofer's unit. Hofer is buried in a mass grave at Jefferson Barracks National Cemetery in St. Louis, Missouri.

Decorations
Among Hofer's decorations are the Distinguished Flying Cross with six oak leaf clusters and three Air Medals.

  Army Air Forces Pilot Badge

Notes

References
Air Classics:Last of the Bad Boy Aces book review of "Kidd Hofer-- The Last of the Screwball Aces"
Kidd Hofer Top Ace of the 4th Fighter Group in WWII at www.starduststudios.com (painting of Kidd Hofer in flight)
 (The Aces: Lt. Ralph K. Hofer, pages 101–104)
Scutts, J. (1994). Mustang Aces of the Eighth Air Force. Oxford: Osprey Publishing.

External links
 
 4th Fighter Group Association WWII

1921 births
1944 deaths
American World War II flying aces
Aviators from Missouri
Aviators killed by being shot down
Recipients of the Distinguished Flying Cross (United States)
United States Army Air Forces officers
United States Army Air Forces personnel killed in World War II
People from Salem, Missouri